Vrettos is a Greek surname. Notable people with the surname include:

Christos Vrettos (1894–1973), Greek athlete
Ioannis Vrettos, Greek long-distance runner
Nikos Vrettos (born 1995), Greek footballer
Spyros Vrettos (born 1960), Greek poet

Greek-language surnames